Dr. Anna Wessels Williams (1863–1954) was an American pathologist at the first municipal diagnostic laboratory in the United States. She used her medical training from the Women's Medical College of the New York Infirmary for research rather than medical practice, and over the course of her career worked on developing vaccines, treatments and diagnostic tests for many diseases, including diphtheria, rabies, scarlet fever, smallpox, influenza, and meningitis. Notably, a strain of diphtheria-causing bacteria that Williams isolated and cultivated was instrumental in producing an antitoxin to bring the disease under control. In 1932, she became the first woman to be elected chair of the laboratory section of the American Public Health Association.

Early life 

Anna Wessels Williams was born in 1863 in Hackensack, New Jersey, to Jane Van Saun and William Williams. After graduating from a local high school in 1883, she became a schoolteacher.

Life of Williams was to change course in 1887, when her sister Millie narrowly escaped death giving birth to a stillborn child. Anna believed that the poor training of the doctor in attendance was partly to blame for the tragedy, and so she resolved to resign from her teaching position and retrain as a physician. Later that year Williams enrolled in the Woman's Medical College of the New York Infirmary, where she was taught by Elizabeth Blackwell and Mary Putnam Jacobi. Williams later wrote: I was starting on a way that had been practically untrod before by any woman. My belief at the time in human individuality, regardless of sex, race, religion or any factor other than ability was at its strongest. I believed, therefore, that females should have equal opportunities with males to develop their powers to the utmost. After graduating in 1891, Williams taught pathology and hygiene at her alma mater, and underwent further medical training in Vienna, Heidelberg, Leipzig, and Dresden.

Research career

Work on Diphtheria 

In 1894, Williams volunteered at the New York City Department of Health's diagnostic laboratory, the first municipal laboratory in the United States, which had opened just a year earlier in response to a cholera outbreak. Williams worked closely with the director, William H. Park, on his projects to tackle diphtheria. In her first year of work she was able to isolate a strain of the diphtheria bacillus which could be used to produce the antitoxin for diphtheria, discovered in 1890, in large quantities. This crucial discovery massively increased the availability of the antitoxin and slashed its cost, and so was instrumental in controlling this devastating disease. Within a year of Williams' discovery, the antitoxin was being shipped to doctors in the United States and England free of charge to address the enormous demand, and Williams was appointed to a full-time staff position as assistant bacteriologist.

Although it was Williams who made the discovery while Park was away, laboratory work is by nature collaborative, so the strain was named Park-Williams No. 8 after both researchers. However, Park-Williams No. 8 was soon shortened in informal usage to Park 8. Though some in her position might have been resentful, Williams did not attach much importance to having things named after her, and said "I am happy to have the honor of having my name thus associated with Dr. Park."

Work on Rabies 

In 1896 Williams traveled to the Pasteur Institute in Paris hoping to find a toxin for scarlet fever that could be used to develop an antitoxin, as she had done for diphtheria. She was unsuccessful, but while there, Williams developed a new interest in the rabies research that was going on in Paris. On her return to New York, she brought a culture of the virus to use in the development of vaccines. Williams managed to produce small quantities of a rabies vaccine from this culture, and after this early demonstration, producing the vaccine became a research priority in the United States. By 1898, an effective vaccine had been developed that could be produced on a large scale.

Williams then turned her attention to another problem in the treatment of rabies: diagnosis. Rabies can have a very long incubation period, meaning that by the time it is diagnosed, it is often too late for a vaccine to be of any use. If it was possible to diagnose rabies before the disease had progressed, more patients would survive. By studying the brains of infected animals, Williams discovered that before symptoms appear, the virus was causing changes to brain cells, which could be used to detect the disease at an earlier stage. Unfortunately for Williams, an Italian doctor called Adelchi Negri had made the same discovery, and in 1904 he was the first to publish his results, so the abnormal cells became known as Negri bodies.

In 1905, Williams developed a new method for preparing and staining brain tissue to show the presence of Negri bodies, which gave results in minutes rather than days. Her method surpassed the original test and became the standard technique for diagnosing rabies for the next thirty years. In 1907, when the American Public Health Association established a committee on the standard methods for the diagnosis of rabies, they named Williams chair of the committee in recognition of her expertise.

Later Work 

In 1905, Williams was promoted to the position of assistant director of the Department of Health laboratory where she had worked since 1894. In this role, she worked toward the better diagnosis and treatment of venereal disease with Emily Barringer, M.D. and, in collaboration with Josephine Baker's Division of Child Hygiene, developed a better diagnostic test for trachoma, a disease that was claiming the eyesight of many of the urban poor, particularly children.

During World War I, Williams directed a training program at New York University for the War Department, to train war workers for medical laboratories at home and overseas. She also researched methods for diagnosing meningitis carriers in the military. After the war ended, Williams was one of the scientists of the front lines of research trying to combat the deadly 1918 pandemic of Spanish flu.

In addition to her laboratory research, Williams coauthored two influential books with William Park, with whom she continued to work closely after their collaboration on the diphtheria antitoxin. In 1905, the pair published their classic text Pathogenic Micro-organisms Including Bacteria and Protozoa: A Practical Manual for Students, Physicians and Health Officers which quickly became known simply as 'Park and Williams' by readers. By 1939 the publication had been reprinted in eleven editions. In 1929, Williams and Park published Who's Who Among the Microbes, thought to be one of the earliest biomedical reference books written for the public.

Over the course of her career, Williams received many honours and awards. In 1915 she was elected president of the Woman's Medical Society of New York.  In the 1920s, Williams had done extensive studies on scarlet fever. The Dick test, which was developed by George and Gladys Dick, was to detect the disease on thousands of children. William had surveyed hundreds of cases that were positively diagnosed with the disease for the antitoxin that had been used. In 1931 she was elected to an office in the laboratory section of the American Public Health Association and the following year became the first woman appointed chair of the section. In 1936, the New York Women's Medical Society honored Dr. Williams for her services to the city at a testimonial dinner. In her acceptance speech, she thanked the colleagues she had worked with over the years, including many of the women who were building careers in bacteriology alongside her or under her own mentorship at the Department of Health.

In 1934, despite an outpouring of support, Williams along with nearly a hundred other workers was made to step down from her position by New York City's mandatory retirement age of seventy. Upon her retirement, mayor Fiorello La Guardia accurately summed up Williams' career: she was, he said, "a scientist of international repute". After retiring, Williams lived another twenty years with her sister in Westwood, New Jersey, where she died in 1954 at the age of ninety.

Publications 

 Log-in required.
Williams, Anna Wessels (1932). Streptococci in relation to man in health and disease. London : Baillière, Tindall & Cox; Baltimore : Williams & Wilkins.
 Manuscript.

Bibliography

References

Further reading 
 O'Hern, Elizabeth Moot (1985). “Anna Wessels Williams 1863–1954”. Profiles of Pioneer Women Scientists. Acropolis Books. pp. 32–. .
 Sicherman, Barbara; Green, Carol Hurd (1980). “Anna Wessels Williams. Military: Florence Aby Blanchfield --”. Notable American Women: The Modern Period: A Biographical Dictionary. Cambridge, Mass.: Belknap Press of Harvard University Press. . .
 “Williams, Anna Wessels--1863–1954”. Records of the Bureau of Vocational Information, 1908–1932. Schlesinger. (1908). .

External links
Anna Wessels Williams Papers. Schlesinger Library, Radcliffe Institute, Harvard University
 National Library of Medicine, Dr. Anna Wessels Williams Biography

1863 births
1954 deaths
People from Hackensack, New Jersey
American bacteriologists
American microbiologists
Women microbiologists